Archiboehmeria is a genus of flowering plants belonging to the family Urticaceae.

Its native range is Southeastern China to Northern Vietnam.

Species:

Archiboehmeria atrata

References

Urticaceae
Urticaceae genera